Backbone Connect is a fast-growing tech business focused on solving the technology challenges for commercial real estate landlords and tenants in the UK. 

Backbone Connect's Connected Building solution is a sustainable, multi-tenant platform designed to provide wayleave-free, high-capacity, secure connectivity in 10 days. They also provide cyber security, cloud, communication and voice, wide area networks, internet access and colocation services.

The company was founded in 2008. In September 2011, it became the UK Data Centre partner for US based Hexagrid. Backbone Connect also achieved notability after becoming a European Level3 Communications Partner in 2010.

In April 2021 it began operating in Scotland

The company operates its services out of several tier III data centres in the UK including Level3 datacentres in London, Global Switch 1 and 2 in the Docklands area of London and others in the UK.

References 

Internet technology companies of the United Kingdom